Backfire is a 1950 American film noir crime film directed by Vincent Sherman starring Edmond O'Brien, Virginia Mayo, Gordon MacRae, Viveca Lindfors and Dane Clark.

The film was written by Larry Marcus, Ben Roberts and Ivan Goff. Goff and Roberts would go on to write White Heat the following year, a film that also stars O'Brien and Mayo.

Although Backfire was completed in October 1948, it was not released until January 1950.

Plot

In November 1948, Bob Corey is an American soldier badly wounded at the end of World War II who is undergoing a number of surgical operations on his spine at the Birmingham General Army Hospital in Van Nuys, California. He is tended by a nurse, Julie Benson, and they have fallen in love. Corey's military pal Steve Connolly, arrives to discuss plans for the ranch in Scottsdale, Arizona that they plan to purchase and operate together when Corey is out of the hospital. The two men pool their G.I. benefits (totaling $40,000) to do so.

Connolly does not appear following Corey's final surgery nor during his recovery. On Christmas Eve, as Corey lies semi-conscious in bed, a woman with a Swedish accent appears at his bedside. She says that Connolly has been in a horrible accident; his spine is shattered and he wants to die, but she has refused to help him commit suicide. The woman asks Corey what to do, and he advises her to do nothing to harm Connolly, and just to wait. Corey slips into unconsciousness and the woman disappears.

After New Year's Day 1949, Corey is released from the hospital. He is immediately stopped by police detectives and then questioned by police captain Garcia, who tells him that Connolly is wanted for the murder of Solly Blayne, a local high-stakes gambler and racketeer murdered at his home in Los Feliz. Corey denies that Connolly would be mixed up in anything criminal.

Corey rents the hotel room where Connolly had been staying, where he encounters Sybil, the gossipy old hotel maid, who says that Mr. Blayne often visited Connolly at the hotel, and on the day of Blayne's death, he visited Conolly and demanded $40,000 that he was owed. She also gives Corey a business card from a funeral home, which Corey visits, discovering that military friend Ben Arno owns the mortuary. Arno describes how he went to a night of boxing matches where he saw Connolly fighting in the ring. Connolly lost his match, but Arno does not believe he should have. Arno asks Connolly why he is boxing at his age, but Connolly refuses to explain other than to say he needs money.

Corey and Nurse Benson talk to Mrs. Blayne, who recalls how an assassin gunned down Solly Blayne in his home one night when Mrs. Blayne was in the kitchen. Mrs. Blayne calls for a doctor, but he arrives too late.

Corey returns to the hotel and, realizing that Connolly had placed two local phone calls, he dials the numbers listed in the hotel records. The first number is for the local time service, but a young woman named Myrna answers the phone at the second number. Corey pretends to be Connolly, and Myrna unintentionally reveals that Connolly had a girlfriend named Lysa Radoff. Corey asks for the address of an apartment in Hollywood. He takes a cab to the address and, finding no one home, lets himself in after finding a key. Radoff's other roommate Bonnie Willis comes home. Corey pretends to be waiting for Radoff to arrive, and the Willis tells him the story of how Connolly and Radoff met. Connolly was working for a local gambler named Lou Walsh, whose girlfriend was Radoff. One night, Connolly went to a nightclub to pick up Radoff and bring her to Walsh's party, and Willis joined them. The three went to a large apartment that Walsh was using as a high-stakes gambling den. Walsh entertains his guests by having beautiful women act as call girls, and Radoff is one of them. Connolly, unlike the other men, never paws and manhandles the girls, and he and Radoff fall in love. Solly Blayne, who was also present, offers Connolly a job as a highly paid gofer. Corey also learns that Radoff is the same woman who had visited him in the hospital. To avoid further conversation with Bonnie, Corey runs out of the house while she is in the kitchen. Moments later, Bonnie is gunned down by an unseen assailant who fires through her window.

The next night, Garcia interrogates Corey and Nurse Benson and accuses them of interfering in the investigation and causing Willis' death. Garcia is alerted by telephone that a local Chinese man, Lee Quong, has been shot and is claiming he has information on Steve Connolly. Garcia, Corey, and Benson race to the hospital to interrogate Quong. Quong relates how he was the butler and cook at a magnificent nearby home which Walsh purchased as a gift for Radoff. Walsh had installed Connolly in the house as her bodyguard unwittingly putting the two lovers together, and their relationship intensified. Quong relates that on December 14 he eavesdropped on Connolly and Radoff as they made plans to run away and get married. Connolly went to the garage and backed the car up the steeply inclined driveway. Unbeknownst to Connolly, Walsh came home early and overheard Connolly professing his love to Radoff. Walsh released the parking brake on the car, and it rolled down the driveway and injured Connolly — crushing several of the vertebrae in his back. Quong then says he fled downtown but was found and shot by Lou Walsh after Walsh realized Quong had seen him commit murder. Quong dies before he can reveal the address of Walsh's home near Bel Air.

Garcia now has evidence that Connolly was physically incapable of committing murder. Garcia tells the press that the murder weapon used to kill Solly Blayne was also used to kill Bonnie Willis. Acting on a hunch, Nurse Benson contacts Mrs. Blayne and asks her the name of the doctor she called the night her husband was murdered. Mrs. Blayne says it was Dr. Herbert Anstead. Benson goes to Dr. Anstead's office later that night in uniform, pretending to be retrieving some files for the doctor. The janitor lets her in. She is unable to locate Connolly's medical file. Anstead arrives a few minutes later, and Benson hides. Anstead retrieves Connolly's file from its hiding place, and attempts to burn it. Anstead is interrupted, and Benson tells him Connolly was not in an accident but was a victim of attempted murder. Anstead forces Benson into a locked room and using information obtained from Benson, he calls Bob Corey to tell him where Connolly can be located, and Benson overhears the address. Just then, Walsh enters the office and guns down Anstead as he pleads for mercy. Walsh flees, and Nurse Benson is released minutes later by the janitor.

Corey rushes to the address Dr. Anstead gave him. Corey is intercepted inside the house by Ben Arno, who reveals that he is the gambler Lou Walsh. Arno tells Corey that Connolly (a known small-time gambler) had lost money to Solly Blayne. To get the money back, Connolly agreed to box and throw the fight to get out of debt. Arno told Connolly that he led a double life as the high-stakes gambler Lou Walsh, and proposed using Connolly's $40,000 to cheat Blayne out of tens of thousands of dollars at gambling to which Connolly agreed. Arno tells Connolly that on Christmas Eve Radoff (after visiting Bobb's hospital room) realized that the brakes on her car work just fine, and that Connolly's injuries were no accident. She attempted to leave, but Walsh strangled her. Arno tells Corey he did not want to martyr Connolly for fear of losing Radoff's love, so he staged the accident. But once Radoff knew the truth, he was forced to kill her. Arno admits he began killing anyone who could connect Lysa to him or who knew about Connolly's accident. Corey, still weak from his back surgery, is knocked to the ground and Arno prepares to shoot him. As Arno is about to kill Corey, an injured Connolly, his body encased in braces and plaster, launches himself down the stairs and stops Arno. The police, summoned by Nurse Benson, arrive. Arno attempts to flee while shooting at police, but is killed.

Many months later, Connolly leaves the military hospital, his injuries repaired by military surgeons. Corey and his new wife Julie arrive and take Steve to their ranch in Arizona.

Production notes

Cast
 Gordon MacRae as Bob Corey
 Edmond O'Brien as Steve Connolly
 Virginia Mayo as Julie Benson
 Viveca Lindfors as Lysa Radoff
 Dane Clark as Ben Arno
 Ed Begley as Captain Garcia
 Sheila MacRae (as Sheila Stephens) as Bonnie Willis
 Mack Williams as Dr. Herbert Anstead
 Leonard Strong as Lee Quong
 Frances Robinson as Mrs. Blayne
 Richard Rober as Solly Blayne
 John Dehner as Blake, plainclothesman

Script development
Around 1946 or 1947, Warner Bros. had purchased the rights to a Larry Marcus story titled Into the Night. The studio tried to interest Vincent Sherman into directing the picture, but he felt the story was "confused and pointless" and refused. Sherman said that one of the story's problems was that it contained "flashback within flashback." However, the finished film, while not employing that technique, does make extensive use of the standard flashback technique, using it seven times throughout the story, with exposition coming once each from Captain Garcia, Sybil, Mrs. Blayne, Bonnie Willis, and Lee Quong, and twice from Ben Arno.

By the spring of 1948, Sherman had finished directing Adventures of Don Juan with Errol Flynn and Viveca Lindfors, and wanted to work on a simple picture. He knew that Warner Bros. had the rights to John Patrick's play The Hasty Heart. Sherman asked studio head Jack L. Warner if he could turn the play into a film, but Warner refused and put him to work on adapting Into the Night into a motion picture.

Sherman met with producer Anthony Veiller, who admitted that the story needed work. Veiller hired two aspiring writers, Ivan Goff and Ben Roberts, who had written a popular play, Portrait in Black (later made into a motion picture of the same name in 1960), as well as an unpublished screenplay, The Shadow, based on a Ben Hecht story. Although Goff and Roberts considered themselves comedy writers, Warner Bros. hired them to work on the crime story Into the Night. Sherman met with Goff and Roberts over the weekend, and they talked through the story's problems. Sherman concluded that the film was still unworkable, but Goff and Roberts continued to craft a screenplay. Sherman voiced his reservations to Jack Warner, but Warner told him that if he agreed to do the film, Warner would do him a favor in return; Sherman agreed. Sherman later said that Goff and Roberts had submitted a good script, and that the actors had done the best job they could.

The shooting title of the film was changed from Into the Night to Somewhere in the City.

Casting
Jack Warner intended for the film to be a B movie for his contract actors. He had six actors who were "sitting around doing nothing but picking up their checks": Edmond O'Brien, Gordon MacRae, Virginia Mayo, Dane Clark, Viveca Lindfors and Richard Rober. Warner Bros. had signed Broadway star Gordon MacRae to a short-term contract in November 1947. The studio announced his first film was to be a musical film, Rise Above It (a remake of the 1938 film Brother Rat, which would be scripted by I. A. L. Diamond), but this film was never made.

Edmond O'Brien signed a contract with Warner Bros. in May 1948, and Into the Night would be his first film for the studio. Lindfors refused at first to participate in the film, upset with what she felt was its excessive violence. Placed on suspension by the studio, she relented to continue to receive her pay ("I sold out," she later said). Sherman said that he found Mayo to be nice and an extremely competent actress, but without much personal depth.

Principal photography
Principal filming occurred from late July to mid-October 1948. Interior and exterior hospital scenes were shot at Birmingham Veterans' Hospital (also known as Birmingham General Army Hospital) in Van Nuys, California. Birmingham's nursing chief Monica Cahill and assistant chief of surgery Dr. Franklin Wilkins served as technical consultants on the film. Additional scenes were filmed in and around Los Angeles, including the Los Angeles City Hall, the Fremont Hotel and the Bunker Hill district, Olvera Street, Hollywood and the Los Feliz neighborhood and Stone Canyon in the Bel Air neighborhood, with 1101 Stone Canyon Road doubling as the film's 1121 Canyon Road. Additional scenes were shot in the nearby city of Glendale. The film specifically mentions several of these locations by name in both the dialogue and the visual narrative.

Music
The film's soundtrack was composed by Daniele Amfitheatrof. The song that Viveca Lindfors sings in the nightclub is "Parlez-moi d'Amour," written by Jean Lenoir.

Reception

Critical response
Although the film was completed in October 1948, it was not released until 1950. The film opened at The Globe cinema in New York City on January 26, 1950. White Heat, starring James Cagney, Edmond O'Brien, and Virginia Mayo, had been released to widespread acclaim and strong box office while Backfire remained unreleased. To take advantage of White Heat's popularity, movie posters for Backfire prominently featured Mayo in a femme fatale pose (very unlike her character in the film) and contained the tag-line: "That 'White Heat' girl turns it on again!" The poster also gave away the surprise conclusion to the film by depicting Dane Clark strangling Viveca Lindfors. 

The picture did not receive good reviews. Bosley Crowther, writing for the New York Times, found the film feeble and listless, and the plot rambling. He had little praise for the cast, concluding "...the most that can possibly be said for them is that they get the thing done." Leslie Halliwell, writing in 1977, noted that the flashback structure, intended to solve some of the expository problems in the film, did not work. Author Clive Hirschhorn noted in 1980 that there were so many coincidences in the film that any feeling of suspense was eliminated and the realism so essential to film noir dissipated. Critic John Howard Reid assessed the film as "borderline" in 2006, but felt cinematography was effectively atmospheric and the action sequences fair. He found that the supporting players (O'Brien, Begley, Lindfors, Clark, and Sheila MacRae) delivered performances remarkably superior to that of the two stars, and singled out Lindfors for her acting.

Some reviewers singled out the script as the underlying cause of the acting problems. Reid thought Mayo's part too slim, and that it had been improperly built up by the script and editing to accommodate a star of her stature. David Shipman felt Gordon MacRae was "wasted" in the picture.

Swedish actress Viveca Lindfors was under contract to Warner Bros. for four pictures. Unhappy with her work, however, the studio declined to pick up her option after her performance in Backfire. Warners was much more pleased with the efforts of Goff and Roberts, and gave them a five-year contract to write screenplays. They produced White Heat the following year. In return for directing Backfire, Jack Warner permitted Vincent Sherman to direct The Hasty Heart, which became a major hit for the studio.

Home media
The film was regularly screened on broadcast television in the United States in the 1950s and 1960s, although most airings trimmed Mayo's part substantially. Warner Bros. released the film on DVD on July 13, 2010, in its Film Noir Classic Collection, Vol. 5.

References

Bibliography

External links
 
 
 
 

1950 films
1950s crime thriller films
American crime thriller films
American black-and-white films
1950s English-language films
Film noir
Films directed by Vincent Sherman
Films scored by Daniele Amfitheatrof
Films set in 1948
Films set in 1949
Warner Bros. films
1950s American films